Olo Fiti Afoa Vaai (formally known as Levaopolo Talatonu Vaai) is a Samoan politician and Cabinet Minister who has served as the minister of Works, Transport and Infrastructure since 2021.

Personal life
Vaai was educated at Avele and Samoa College before studying for a Bachelors degree in Telecommunications Engineering at Auckland University of Technology. He subsequently worked for the Samoa Airports Authority as a technical manager and then assistant chief executive. He is from a political family, and his uncle Leilua Manuao served as a Member of parliament for 40 years.

Political career
Vaai was first elected to the Samoan Parliament in the 2006 Samoan general election as MP for Gagaemauga No. 2, running as a candidate for the Samoan Democratic United Party (SDUP). Following the collapse of the SDUP in 2008 he joined the Tautua Samoa Party, resulting in his seat being declared vacant by the Speaker. The decision was overturned by the Supreme Court of Samoa in July 2009, and Vaai retained his seat. He was re-elected as a Tautua candidate in the 2011 election. 

In 2015 Vaai decided to switch electorates and contest the seat of Salega East in the 2016 election following a decision by his village to reject a tourism project he had proposed. As a result, he was disqualified from Parliament as he was no longer eligible to represent his old seat. He subsequently announced plans to form a new political party and contested the election as an independent, but after winning re-election he re-joined Tautua. When he switched electorates, he adopted a new title, becoming Olo Fiti Vaai. In the 2016 term he was a vocal critic of the government, being called a "One man Opposition Party" by the media. In May 2019 he was removed from the Finance and Expenditure Committee after criticising government spending decisions. In December 2019 he called on the government to launch an inquiry into the 2019 Samoa measles outbreak, saying "we failed you, Samoa".

In October 2020 Vaai registered to run as a candidate for the F.A.S.T. party in the 2021 election. As a result his seat was declared vacant under anti-party-hopping provisions. On 14 December 2020 the decision was declared unlawful and invalid by the Supreme Court of Samoa.

On 24 May 2021 he was appointed Minister of Works, Transport and Infrastructure in the elected cabinet of Fiamē Naomi Mataʻafa. The appointment was disputed by the caretaker government. On 23 July 2021 the Court of Appeal ruled that the swearing-in ceremony was constitutional and binding, and that FAST had been the government since 24 May. 

In June 2022, Olo announced that he would be suing opposition leader Tuila'epa Sa'ilele Malielegaoi for defamation. Tuila'epa had previously alleged that Olo registered a government automobile as his private property, which the opposition leader claimed was the equivalent of theft. Olo said that comment dishonoured his family and constituency. In addition, Olo also filed a lawsuit against Maota o Vi'iga, a Samoan radio station based in Australia, for echoing Tuila'epa's claims.

Notes

References

|-

|-

|-

|-

|-

Living people
Members of the Legislative Assembly of Samoa
Tautua Samoa Party politicians
Samoan Democratic United Party politicians
Faʻatuatua i le Atua Samoa ua Tasi politicians
Public works ministers of Samoa
Transport ministers of Samoa
Year of birth missing (living people)
Auckland University of Technology alumni
21st-century Samoan politicians